The Minyades were three Orchomenian (Arcadian) princesses in Greek mythology. These sisters were protagonists of a myth about the perils of neglecting the worship of Dionysus.

Names and family 
The names of the Minyades were Alcathoe (or Alcithoe), Leucippe and Arsippe (although instead of "Arsippe", Claudius Aelianus calls the latter "Aristippa", and Plutarch "Arsinoë"; Ovid uses "Leuconoe" instead of "Leucippe"). They were daughters of Minyas, king of Orchomenus, Boeotia.

Mythology

At the time when the worship of Dionysus was introduced into Boeotia, and while the other women and maidens were reveling and ranging over the mountains in Bacchic joy, these sisters alone remained at home, devoting themselves to their usual occupations, and thus profaning the days sacred to the god.  Dionysus punished them by changing them into bats, and their work into vines. Plutarch, Aelian, and Antoninus Liberalis, though with some differences in the detail, relate that Dionysus appeared to the sisters in the form of a maiden, and invited them to partake in the Dionysian Mysteries.  When the sisters declined the invitation, the god metamorphosed himself successively into a bull, a lion, and a panther, and the sisters were driven mad.

In this state of madness, they were eager to honor the god, and Leucippe, who was chosen by lot to offer a sacrifice to Dionysus, gave up her own son Hippasus, whom the sisters tore to pieces.  The sisters afterwards roamed over the mountains in a frenzy, until at last Hermes changed them into bats.  Plutarch adds that down to his time the men of Orchomenus descended from that family were called psoloeis, that is, mourners, and the women oleiai or aioleiai ( or ), that is, the destroyers.

Antoninus' account 
Another retelling of the wrathful punishment of the Minyades by the god Dionysus appeared in Antoninus Liberalis' Metamorphoses:The daughters of Minyas, son of Orchomenus, were Leucippe, Arsippe and Alcathoe. They turned out to be startlingly diligent. They strongly criticized other women because they abandoned the city to go as Bacchantes in the hills until Dionysus took on the likeness of a girl and urged the Minyades not to miss out on the rites or mysteries of the god. But they paid no heed to him. At this—not surprisingly—Dionysus was angered and instead of a girl became a bull, then a lion, then a leopard. From the beams of their looms there flowed for him milk and nectar.At these portents, terror gripped the maidens. Without delay, the three threw lots into a pot and shook it. The lot fell to Leucippe and she vowed to offer as a sacrifice to the god her own son Hippasus whom she tore to pieces with the help of her sisters. Abandoning their paternal home, they went as Bacchantes in the mountains, browsing on ivy, honeysuckle, and laurel, until Hermes touched them with his wand and changed them into flying creatures. One of them became a bat, another an owl and the third an eagle owl. And all three continuously avoided the light of  the sun.

See also
 Leutogi - Polynesian bat goddess
 Camazotz - Mayan bat god
 Nyctimene (mythology)

Notes

References 

 Antoninus Liberalis, The Metamorphoses of Antoninus Liberalis translated by Francis Celoria (Routledge 1992). Online version at the Topos Text Project.
 Claudius Aelianus, Varia Historia translated by Thomas Stanley (d.1700) edition of 1665. Online version at the Topos Text Project.
 Claudius Aelianus, Claudii Aeliani de natura animalium libri xvii, varia historia, epistolae, fragmenta, Vol 2. Rudolf Hercher. In Aedibus B.G. Teubneri. Lipsiae. 1866. Greek text available at the Perseus Digital Library. 
 Lucius Mestrius Plutarchus, Moralia with an English Translation by Frank Cole Babbitt. Cambridge, MA. Harvard University Press. London. William Heinemann Ltd. 1936. Online version at the Perseus Digital Library. Greek text available from the same website.
 Publius Ovidius Naso, Metamorphoses translated by Brookes More (1859-1942). Boston, Cornhill Publishing Co. 1922. Online version at the Perseus Digital Library.
 Publius Ovidius Naso, Metamorphoses. Hugo Magnus. Gotha (Germany). Friedr. Andr. Perthes. 1892. Latin text available at the Perseus Digital Library.

Further reading

Princesses in Greek mythology
Metamorphoses into animals in Greek mythology
Minyan characters in Greek mythology
Dionysus in mythology
Bats in culture
Metamorphoses into birds in Greek mythology